MMA gloves or grappling gloves are small, open-fingered gloves optionally used in mixed martial arts bouts. They usually have around 4–6 oz of padding and are designed to provide some protection to the person wearing the glove, but leave the fingers available for grappling maneuvers such as clinch fighting and submissions.

History
  
Small, open-fingered gloves were first mandatory in Japan's Shooto promotion and were later adopted by the UFC as it developed into a regulated sport. Gloves were introduced to protect fighters' fists from injuries, as well as reduce the number of facial lacerations (and stoppages due to cuts) that fighters experienced without gloves. The introduction of gloves was also intended to encourage fighters to use their hands for striking to allow more captivating matches for fans. There are some similarities to the wrist-supporting, closed-thumb, broken-knuckle kempo gloves popularized by Bruce Lee's 1973 movie Enter the Dragon.

Types and use

Competition gloves - Most professional fights have the fighters wear 4 ounce (110 g) gloves, whereas amateurs may wear a slightly heavier 6 ounce (170 g) glove for increased protection. According to the rules, UFC allows gloves between 4-6 ounces, and even heavier for certain larger sized gloves, e.g. 2 XL – 4 XL.

Sparring gloves - Generally speaking MMA sparring gloves weight is usually 7 ounces. When sparring there is obviously a lot of punching involved, from working the bag to actual sparring with a partner. Both of these require that your knuckles are adequately protected and cushioned from the forces put upon them. The 7oz refers to the weight of the padding inside the gloves and not the overall weight.

Grappling gloves -  Otherwise known as hybrid or training gloves these are used mainly for clinch work/grappling.This type of glove has less padding than sparring or competition gloves. In addition each finger can be moved independently allowing for more gripping ability.

Impact of gloves on safety and injuries
The impact of gloves on the injuries caused during a fight is a controversial issue, mostly looked at in relation to boxing. The use of padded gloves in fights protect the fists of the wearer but don't prevent brain injury unless they are so large that they become difficult to use. These gloves protect the fists of the wearer and allow stronger punches than in bare-knuckle fights, and it is the changes in acceleration to the head as a whole that tears the blood vessels, not the impact with the glove.

List of MMA Gloves Approved by Associations

See also
Cestus
Boxing glove
Types of glove

References

External links

Mixed martial arts
MMA gloves
MMA gloves
Sports gloves
Fist-load weapons